The 1928 United States presidential election in New Jersey took place on November 6, 1928. All contemporary 48 states were part of the 1928 United States presidential election. Voters chose 14 electors to the Electoral College, which selected the president and vice president.

New Jersey was won by the Republican nominees, Secretary of Commerce Herbert Hoover of California and his running mate Senate Majority Leader Charles Curtis of Kansas. Hoover and Curtis defeated the Democratic nominees, Governor Alfred E. Smith of New York and his running mate Senator Joseph Taylor Robinson of Arkansas. 

Hoover carried New Jersey with 59.77 percent of the vote to Smith's 39.79 percent, a victory margin of 19.98 percentage points. Finishing in a distant third was the Socialist Party candidate Norman Thomas, with only 0.32 percent.

New Jersey in this era was a staunchly Republican state, having not given a majority of the vote to a Democratic presidential candidate since 1892. As Herbert Hoover was winning a third consecutive nationwide Republican landslide amidst the economic boom and social good feelings of the Roaring Twenties under popular Republican leadership, New Jersey easily remained in the Republican column.

However Smith for his part did make dramatic gains for the Democratic Party in New Jersey, laying the groundwork for ultimately turning the state Democratic just four years later in 1932. In 1920, Republican Warren G. Harding had carried the state over Democrat James M. Cox by a massive 68–28 margin. In 1924, southern Democrat John W. Davis had received only 27 percent of the vote in the state to Republican Calvin Coolidge's 62 percent. Even as Hoover won a third nationwide Republican landslide, New Jersey swung 15 points toward the Democrats over the previous 1920s GOP performances in the state, with Smith taking nearly 40 percent of the statewide vote. 

On the county level map, reflecting the decisiveness of his victory, Hoover won 20 of the state's 21 counties. Despite losing ground overall at the state level, Hoover made gains in the western parts of the state where the reaction to Catholicism was hostility. His strongest county win was in rural Salem County by the Delaware border, where he broke 80% of the vote, a dramatic improvement over the sixty percent vote shares won in that county by Republicans in 1920 and 1924.

However, Al Smith, a New York City native, and Roman Catholic of Irish, Italian and German immigrant heritage, appealed greatly to urban areas populated by ethnic immigrant communities, laying the groundwork for a new urban Democratic coalition. Urban parts of New Jersey, particularly in North Jersey which shared close ties with New York City, swung in Smith's favor. Essex County, home to Newark, swung Democratic, as did Middlesex, Passaic, Union, Bergen, and Mercer counties. 

Nevertheless, by far the greatest Democratic swing occurred in heavily populated Hudson County, part of the New York City metro area, and populated by many urban ethnic Catholic immigrant communities. Despite losing every other county in the state, Al Smith won Hudson County with a commanding majority of more than 60% of the vote. This mirrored the results in the nearby 5 boroughs of New York City right across the Hudson River, all of which swung from voting Republican in 1920 and 1924 to voting decisively Democratic in 1928.

While New Jersey remained Republican in 1928, its overall trend was Democratic, going from being 13% more Republican than the nation in 1920 to 10% more Republican than the nation in 1924 to only 2.56% more Republican than the nation in 1928, foreshadowing New Jersey's political future as being a closely divided swing state with only a slight Republican lean for much of the 20th century until New Jersey ultimately became a solidly Democratic state in the 1990s.

Results

Results by county

See also
 Presidency of Herbert Hoover
 United States presidential elections in New Jersey

References

New Jersey
1928
1928 New Jersey elections